Charles Rozoy (born 4 March 1987 in Chenôve) is a Paralympic swimmer of France who won a gold medal at the 2012 Summer Paralympics in the men's S8 100m butterfly.

References

External links 
 
 

Paralympic gold medalists for France
Swimmers at the 2012 Summer Paralympics
French male breaststroke swimmers
French male butterfly swimmers
French male freestyle swimmers
Sportspeople from Côte-d'Or
1987 births
Living people
Medalists at the 2012 Summer Paralympics
S8-classified Paralympic swimmers
Medalists at the World Para Swimming Championships
Medalists at the World Para Swimming European Championships
Paralympic medalists in swimming
Paralympic swimmers of France